Lieselotte "Liesel" Westermann-Krieg (born Westermann on 2 November 1944) is a retired German discus thrower. She held the world record from 5 November 1967 to 12 August 1971, with a two-months break in 1968. She competed for West Germany at the 1968 and 1972 Olympics and finished in second and fifth place, respectively. She won silver medals at the 1966 and 1971 European championships. For her athletics achievements Westermann was selected as the German Sportspersonality of the year in 1967 and 1969, and inducted into the Germany's Sports Hall of Fame in 2011.

After retiring from competitions Westermann worked as a teacher of physical education, eventually becoming a consultant for sports and health education with the Ministry for Science and Culture of Lower Saxony. An avid opponent of doping (she was once described as the last undoped discus world record holder) she was a member of the Anti-Doping Commission of the German Sports Federation and the National Olympic Committee. Westermann is married and has four children. As a member of the Free Democratic Party she unsuccessfully contested district elections in 1984.

Publications
 Liesel Westermann (1977) Es kann nicht immer Lorbeer sein. Molden, Munich, .

References

1944 births
Living people
People from Sulingen
German female discus throwers
West German female discus throwers
Olympic athletes of West Germany
Olympic silver medalists for West Germany
Athletes (track and field) at the 1968 Summer Olympics
Athletes (track and field) at the 1972 Summer Olympics
World record setters in athletics (track and field)
European Athletics Championships medalists
Medalists at the 1968 Summer Olympics
Olympic silver medalists in athletics (track and field)
Universiade medalists in athletics (track and field)
Universiade gold medalists for West Germany
Medalists at the 1967 Summer Universiade
Medalists at the 1970 Summer Universiade
Sportspeople from Lower Saxony